Vărgata is a commune in Mureș County, Transylvania, Romania composed of five villages:
Grâușorul / Búzaháza
Mitrești / Nyárádszentmárton
Vadu / Vadad
Valea / Jobbágyfalva
Vărgata

History 

It formed part of the Székely Land region of the historical Transylvania province. Until 1918, the village belonged to the Maros-Torda County of the Kingdom of Hungary. After the Treaty of Trianon of 1920, it became part of Romania.

It was first mentioned in 1412 as Chykfalua (Csíkfalva).

Demographics

The commune has an absolute Hungarian majority. According to the 2011 census, it had a population of 1,945; out of them, 81.1% were Hungarian, 14.3% were Roma and 0.6% were Romanian.

See also 
 List of Hungarian exonyms (Mureș County)

References

Communes in Mureș County
Localities in Transylvania